Rachael Simms (born 7 September 1983) is a Scottish curler.

At the national level, she is a two-time Scottish women's champion (2009, 2014) and a 2009 mixed doubles champion.

Teams

Women's

Mixed

Mixed doubles

References

External links

Video: 

Living people
1983 births
Scottish female curlers
Scottish curling champions
Place of birth missing (living people)